Lisa Robertson (born 16 May 1992) is a Scottish footballer. She currently plays for Celtic of the SWPL 1.

Club career
Lisa Robertson grew up in Dalkeith, Scotland. She played for boys' teams in her youth before joining Hibernian girls as a 14-year-old. Robertson signed for the senior team less than a year later in January 2008.

Hibernian
Robertson won her first major trophy when she played in the 2010 Scottish Women's Cup final, as an 18-year-old against Rangers. Hibs won the final 2–1.

Spokane Shine
During the Summer of 2012 Robertson left Scotland for the United States where she played for Spokane Shine Ladies in the Women's Premier Soccer League for the Summer.

Glasgow City
She returned from the United States and signed for Glasgow City in December 2012. She played for City for one year before re-signing for Hibs for the 2014 season.

Hibernian second spell
In 2014 Robertson resigned for Hibernian.

International career
Robertson played for the Scotland U-17 and U-19 teams. She was called into the national squad in February 2021, and made her full international debut in a 10–0 win against Cyprus on 19 February.

Personal life
Robertson runs her own painting and decorating company in Edinburgh.

Honours 
As a Hibs player, Robertson has won the Scottish Cup three times in 2010, 2016 and 2017 and the League Cup four times in 2011, 2016, 2017 and 2018. She has been runner-up with Hibs in the league three times in 2015, 2016 and 2017. She was part of the treble winning Glasgow City team of 2013.

Club

Hibernian
 Scottish Women's Cup (3): 2010, 2016, 2017
 Scottish Women's Premier League Cup (3): 2011, 2016, 2017, 2018

Glasgow City
 Scottish Women's Premier League (1): 2013
 Scottish Women's Cup (1): 2013
 Scottish Women's Premier League Cup (1): 2013

References

External links
 
 

1992 births
Hibernian W.F.C. players
People from Dalkeith
Living people
Scottish Women's Premier League players
Scottish women's footballers
Women's association football midfielders
Durham W.F.C. players
Glasgow City F.C. players
Women's Premier Soccer League players
Expatriate women's soccer players in the United States
Scottish expatriate women's footballers
Scottish expatriate sportspeople in the United States
Sportspeople from Midlothian
Scotland women's international footballers